Castle Berg is a ruined water castle situated around  above Sea level in the Nesenbach valley on the grounds of the Berg mineral spa in the Berg district of Baden-Württemberg's state capitol of Stuttgart, Germany.

The castle was built by the Lords von Berg during the 12th century and had already been destroyed in 1287. The foundations were unearthed in 1856 during construction of the spa's spring water bathhouses.

References

Bibliography
Note: The titles of the following books have been translated into English

Water castles in Germany
Ruined castles in Germany
Castles in Stuttgart